Demense Farm Minor Arboreturm is a botanic garden located in the Mid North Coast region of New South Wales.

Features 
90% of the plants in the garden are Australian fauna featuring species of Callistemon.

History 
The Arboretum was established in 1983 by M. Sewell.

References 

Botanical gardens in New South Wales
Mid North Coast